Lac-Jacques-Cartier is a large unorganized territory in the Capitale-Nationale region of Quebec, Canada, in the La Côte-de-Beaupré Regional County Municipality, making up more than 85% of this regional county. It is unpopulated and undeveloped, almost entirely part of the Jacques-Cartier National Park and the Laurentides Wildlife Reserve.

Quebec Route 175 bisects the territory, and passes on the western shore of Lake Jacques-Cartier, after which the territory is named and source of the Jacques-Cartier River.

Demographics
Population trend:
 Population in 2016: 0
 Population in 2011: 0
 Population in 2006: 0
 Population in 2001: 0
 Population in 1996: 0
 Population in 1991: 3

See also
 List of unorganized territories in Quebec

References

External links

Unorganized territories in Capitale-Nationale
Laurentides Wildlife Reserve